I Heart You is the second studio album by Filipino actor and singer Daniel Padilla under Star Records, released on April 14, 2014 in the Philippines. I Heart You is the first single of the same title of the album.
 
After the success of his first major concert in 2013, he sets a second concert called DOS: The Daniel Padilla Birthday Concert at Smart Araneta Coliseum.

Reception
The digital album peaked at No.1 on the iTunes Philippines chart, as well as the physical album, reached No. 1 spot on Odyssey Music & Video’s nationwide sales reports. The album also reported beat One Direction and Mariah Carey in Astrovision/Astroplus Top-Selling Albums. Less than a month after its release, I Heart You achieved platinum record status along with the double platinum record for DJP on ASAP, May 29, 2014 and received double platinum certification on May 8, 2015. The album earned ASAP Pop Viewers Choice Awards and nomination at the 2014 PMPC Star Awards for Album Cover Concept & Design of the Year.

Track listing

Personnel

 Malou N. Santos & Roxy Liquigan – Executive Producers
 Rox B. Santos – Over-all Album Producer,Vocal Supervision, Vocals Produced, Backup Vocals 
 Jonathan Manalo – Audio Content Head
 Jayson Sarmiento – Promo Specialist
 Marivic Benedicto – Star Song, inc and New Media Head
 Joel Ramos – Digital Marketing Strategist
 Regie Sandel – Sales and Distribution
 Beth Faustio – Music Publishing Officer
 Eaizen Almazan – New Media Technical Assistant
 Abbey Aledo – Music Servicing Officer
 Ryan Ko – Make-up Artist
 Ton Lao – Stylist
 Marc Nicdao – Photographer
 Andrew Castillo – Creative Head
 April Mae Aragones – Album layout Designer
 Thellie Castro-Palanisamy – Branded Entertainment Unit Head
 Karen Almeida-Pedrealba, Princess Bernardo, Jacqueline Chua, Janina Garcia, Niki Soriano – B.E.U. Account Executives 
 Sugar David, Donna Seat – B.E.U. Coordinators
 Dante Tañedo – Album Master, Recorded, Mixing at the Bellhaus Studios  
 Viva Music Publishing, Inc. – Publisher
 Jack Rufo – Live Guitars
 Raizo Chabeldin – Vocals Produced
 Nino Regalado – Live Drums 
 Jack Rufo – Backup Vocals

Weekly charts

Release history

References

External links 
 

Star Music albums
2014 albums
Daniel Padilla albums